Sally James may refer to:

Sally James (writer) (born 1943), pseudonym of the British romantic novelist Marina Oliver
Sally James (presenter) (born 1950), presenter on the ITV Saturday morning children's show Tiswas
Sally Knyvette (born 1951), British actress born Sally James